Japanese-Lithuanian Hieroglyphs Dictionary is the Japanese-Lithuanian dictionary. It is the only Japanese–Lithuanian dictionary that has been published in Lithuania. Author – hab. dr. Dalia Švambarytė.

In the dictionary, there are total 3763 kanji.

Lithuanian dictionaries
Japanese dictionaries